Mowmai (also Romanized as Mowma’ī) is a village in Howmeh-ye Jonubi Rural District, in the Central District of Eslamabad-e Gharb County, Kermanshah Province, Iran. At the 2006 census, its population was 1,301, in 251 families.

References 

Populated places in Eslamabad-e Gharb County